Champion is a 2018 South Korean sports comedy film directed by Kim Yong-wan. The film stars Ma Dong-seok, Kwon Yul, and Han Ye-ri. It is related to arm wrestling competition. The movie is rated 9.4/10 in Asian TV Website within the first month of release.

Plot
The film tells the story of the adopted Mark who was a former arm wrestler but now works as a bouncer. He goes to South Korea for a competition to search for his mother who gave him up for adoption as a child. With help of his friend, Jin-ki, Mark finds his real family, only to learn that his mother had died. He then meets his step-sister and her family whom he never knew. Through his mother's emails that he came to read he learned what it meant to feel her pain of abandoning him. He later wins the national tournament against his opponents and in the end, defeats the opponent named Punch in the final.

Cast
 Ma Dong-seok as Mark / Baek Seung-min
 Kwon Yul as Jin-ki
 Han Ye-ri as Soo-jin
 Choi Seung-hun as Joon-hyung
 Ok Ye-rin as Joon-hee

Reception
The website's critic review for Champion reads: "Champion's biggest strengths are its comedic sensibilities, as director Kim Yong-Wan recognizes the inherent absurdity of arm-wrestling and plays it up for big laughs."

Frank Scheck of The Hollywood Reporter wrote:

References

External links 
 

2010s sports comedy-drama films
South Korean sports comedy-drama films
2018 films
Warner Bros. films
Arm wrestling
2010s South Korean films